Phillip Ross (born 1929) is an Australian-born television actor. He appeared in many British, American and Australian television series and films, between 1960 until 2000, which include No Hiding Place, The Avengers, Z-Cars, The Private Life of Sherlock Holmes, S*P*Y*S, Prisoner, Return to Eden, A Country Practice, My Boyfriend's Back and others.

Acting credits

References

External links

1929 births
Living people
British male television actors
Australian male actors